Kadlec (feminine Kadlecová) is a Czech surname meaning weaver. Notable people with the surname include:

 Andrej Kadlec (born 1996), Slovak footballer
 Arnold Kadlec (born 1959), Czech ice hockey player
 Drahomír Kadlec (born 1965), Czech ice hockey player
 Jan Kadlec (born 1989), Czech footballer
 Jiřina Kadlecová (born 1948), Czech field hockey player
 Klára Kadlecová (born 1995), Czech figure skater
 Marta Kadlecová (born 1944), Czech swimmer
 Michal Kadlec (born 1984), Czech footballer
 Milan Kadlec (born 1974), Czech racing cyclist
 Milan Kadlec (pentathlete) (1958–2001), Czech pentathlete
 Miroslav Kadlec (born 1964), Czech footballer
 Monika Kadlecová (born 1990), Slovak road cyclist
 Petr Kadlec (born 1977), Czech ice hockey player
 Robert Kadlec, American civil servant
 Václav Kadlec (born 1992), Czech footballer
 Vladimír Kadlec, German basketball player

See also
 
 

Czech-language surnames
Occupational surnames